

َAbout this list

The State of Qatar contains several historical sites protected by the Qatar Museums Authority, one of which is classified as a Unesco  World Heritage Site, Al Zubarah Fort.

List of heritage areas

See also
Archaeology of Qatar
Heritage sites 
Freiha 
Ruwayda
List of archaeological sites by country#Qatar

References

Archaeological sites in Qatar
 
Qatar